Sreeraj Gopinathan (born May 20, 1969, in Kollam, India) is a German contemporary artist of Indian descent. His work is characterized by its interdisciplinarity and dominated in particular by projects based on environmental and climate-relevant concepts.

Life and work 

The experiences of childhood in a traditional healer family and in the nature rich environment of the coastal region of Kerala were decisive for Gopinathan's development.

For the first artistic experiments he used natural materials and paper, which he combined with cooked rice as an adhesive in order to make plastic forms.

Often he drew or painted portraits of acquaintances from the neighbourhood but also of famous personalities. He preferred to choose older people, whose facial features reflected their past life. Another interest in his youth was the discovery of the diversity of flavours and the use of spices in the cuisine of South India.

From 1987 to 1992 he studied painting at the Raja Ravi Varma College of Fine Arts in Mavelikkara. The few resources at his disposal limited his beginnings to drawing and painting in which he liked to capture human faces and natural structures. By combining the two, he developed his own style. In 1989 and 1993, he participated in the annual exhibition of the Kerala Lalithakala Akademi, a cultural organization of the government of Kerala and won the Annual State Award for Painting in 1993.

The enthusiasm for the humanistic and nature-bound life's work of the Indian poet and philosopher Rabindranath Tagore led Gopinathan to Santiniketan. From 1993 to 1996 he studied painting at the Visva-Bharati University under the painter Suhas Roy and parallel the French language under the writer Saraju Gita Banerjee. In 1993, he was awarded the scholarship of Visva-Bharati University and in 1995 the National Scholarship of the Ministry of Human Resource Development, government of India.

In 1996, Gopinathan received the Bourse du Gouvernement Français. With the residence scholarship, he studied fine arts at the École supérieure of the beaux-arts du Mans in France. Benefiting from the new techniques, he began experimenting with new components such as photography, light art, and installation. This resulted in a series of three-dimensional light-integrated objects.

In 1998, he moved to the south German city of Coburg. Making use of the experience gained during the employment at Landestheater Coburg he added a new segment − performance − to his compositions of light, darkness and space. Gopinathan integrated a time-bound action of the audience into the perception process. The first presentation of those contemplation rooms took place in 2000 in the Hanseatic city of Lemgo. In the following years he exhibited more works from this series in Ebern (2002), Bedheim (2002), Bad Königshofen in Grabfeld (2002) and Munich (2003).

Perception 
Despite the different facets of his development, there exists a cohesion like a recurring theme throughout Gopinathan's creative process from the beginning − a universal attitude, the view of a large whole, of an intangible mystery, which seems to escape any attempt at rapprochement.

His passionate attachment to nature soon led to a confrontation with the impact of human life on the planet, which flowed seamlessly into his work. It increasingly developed into a practically implemented form of life, in which existence and art no longer form separate aspects, but merge into each other without a dividing line.

Sreeraj Gopinathan deems it as a necessity to assign an existential purpose to his projects and therefore connects them to the mainstream of life. Art should serve here as a tool to stimulate a change of attitude towards a more conscious way of thinking and acting.

Projects 

In order to devote himself to detailed research, Gopinathan retired in 2004 from public appearances largely back. From his studies, two solution-oriented projects emerged, focusing on the relationship between nature and human in the context of the drastic changes on earth. To achieve this he combined various disciplines such as art, science, philosophy and ecology. Both projects allow an active participation of the audience in the artistic process. Sreeraj Gopinathan deems it as a necessity to assign an existential purpose to his projects and therefore connects them to the mainstream of life. Art should serve here as a tool to stimulate a change of attitude towards a more conscious way of thinking and acting.

Project OWIYAM 
In 2005, Gopinathan launched his first large-scale project OWIYAM in Kanthalloor, a remote location in the mountainous region of South India known as Western Ghats. The surrounding forest is characterized by a unique flora and fauna, but increasingly threatened by human influences. The project is dedicated to the construction of a timely Noah's Ark − a model space, a refuge for rare animals and plants, in which nature and human form a harmonious coexistence. The ultimate aim is to preserve biodiversity in a protected area. The involvement of the local population is presupposed by the underlying concept. Ultimately, the project contributes to the conservation of the rainforest, the lung of the planet. Practical trainings offered on topics such as reforestation, permaculture, clay-architecture, climate-friendly nutrition and cooking method as well as -neutral energy production are a crucial parts of the project.

Project SAMASYA 

The fragility of environment and climate forms the nucleus of Gopinathan's second project titled SAMASYA, which began in 2016. With this project he addresses the industrial societies, the hub of a world in transition. Based on his perspective that the aspect food plays a key role in the unity of the entire web of life, he designed an energy reducing and resource saving, vegan nutritional concept. In order to achieve an ample social participation for the implementation of the project, he uses a mixture of methods such as Internet publication, performance, light installation and culinary art, which are assembled on the same stage. The concept, that speaks to the elementary needs of the human being, aims to sensitize society and pave the way for a collective change of consciousness. To make an active contribution to the preservation of Earth's life network is the primary objective of the Project.

Since 2005 Sreeraj Gopinathan lives and works in Berlin and in Kanthalloor, South India.

Awards   

 Annual State Award, Kerala Lalithakala Akademie, Government of Kerala, India, 1993
 Scholarship, Kala-Bhavana, Visva-Bharati University, Santiniketan, India, 1993–1994
 National Scholarship, Ministry of Human Resource Development, Government of India, 1995–1996
Boursier du gouvernement français, France, 1996–1997
Projektförderpreis, Kunstverein TARA art e.V., Bavaria, 2018

Solo exhibitions 

 1995 The Waiting – Drawings and Mixedmedia 1994–1995, Kala-Bhavana, Visva-Bharati University, Santiniketan, India
 1998 Sreeraj Gopinathan – Zeichnungen, Gemälde und Fotoarbeiten 1995–1997, Annette Falk Keramik, Hofheim in Unterfranken, Bavaria
 2002 Bilder, Objekte und Installationen von Sreeraj Gopinathan, Schloss Bedheim, Thuringia, sponsored by Thüringer Ministerium für Bildung, Jugend und Sport
 2003 Sreeraj Gopinathan – Über dem Horizont, Lichtintegrierte Objekte, Bilder, Zeichnungen, Galerie des Lehr- und Forschungsinstitutes DAP e.V., Munich, Bavaria, sponsored by the City of Coburg and by the art association TARA art e.V.

Group exhibitions (selection) 

 1989 19th STATE EXHIBITION OF ART 1989, Exhibition of selected artists, Kerala Lalithakala Akademi, Government of Kerala, India
 1993 23rd STATE EXHIBITION OF ART 1993 n, Exhibition of selected artists, Kerala Lalithakala Akademi, Government of Kerala, India
 1999 Kunstpreis der Nürnberger Nachrichten 1999 Exhibition of selected artists, Schloss Pommersfelden, Bavaria
 2000 Gewagt, Exhibition of selected artists, Oldenburg, Lower Saxony
 2000 Stipendium Junge Kunst 2000, Exhibition of selected artists, Lemgo, North Rhine-Westphalia
 2001 Kunstausstellung NATUR – MENSCH, Exhibition of selected artists, Sankt Andreasberg, Lower Saxony
 2002 Indische zeitgenössische Kunst, Exhibition of Indian contemporary artists, Akademie für Gestaltung und Denkmalpflege, Ebern, Bavaria
 2002 Feuer und Wasser, Kunstausstellung 2002, Exhibition of selected artists, Archäologisches Museum Bad Königshofen im Grabfeld, Bavaria
 2004 Kunstausstellung 2004, Exhibition of selected artists, Archäologisches Museum Bad Königshofen im Grabfeld, Bavaria

Publications

Books 
 Sreeraj Gopinathan – Über dem Horizont , Lichtintegrierte Objekte, Bilder, Zeichnungen und Texte 1994–2002, picture book, Coburg 2003, German language, publisher: TARA art e.V. art association, 
 Sreeraj Gopinathan – SAMASYA – Irdisch und kosmisch zugleich, picture book, Berlin 2014, German language publisher: TARA art e.V. art association

Internet publications 

 Indisch kulinarisch – umweltschonend, klimafreundlich, vegan – Eine gesunde und nachhaltige Interpretation der indischen Kochkunst, Project SAMASYA, Part I – Resensitization, Berlin 2016, German language, publisher: Sreeraj Gopinathan

Magazines 

 L'ami (Poem and ink drawing), French language, Kolkatta 2014, im Magazin Le cri de la mouche, Publisher: Alliance Française du Bengale, India
 Ma grand-mère (Poem and ink drawing), French language, Kolkatta 2014, im Magazin Le cri de la mouche, Publisher: Alliance Française du Bengale, India

Video documentation 
 Interdisziplinäres Projekt SAMASYA Teil I – Resensitization, Einführung von Holger Christian Stockinger, German language, publisher: Sreeraj Gopinathan 2016

Literature 
 Margit Hess: Erlebnisräume als Sprungbrett für das Bewusstsein - zum zweiten Teil des Projekts SAMASYA – Elementary. In: Website Project SAMASYA
 Holger Christian Stockinger: Die Stille und das Dunkel. In: Website Sreeraj Gopinathan
 Margit Hess: Odyssee zur Wiege des Lebens. In: Website Project OWIYAM
 Nobert Kastner: Grußwort. In: Sreeraj Gopinathan – Über dem Horizont: Lichtintegrierte Objekte, Bilder, Zeichnungen und Texte 1994–2002, publisher: TARA art e.V. art association, .
 Margit Hess: Im Zwielicht. In: Sreeraj Gopinathan – SAMASYA – Irdisch und kosmisch zugleich, publisher: TARA art e.V. art association 
 Holger Christian Stockinger: Prolog. In: Sreeraj Gopinathan – SAMASYA – Irdisch und kosmisch zugleich, publisher: TARA art e.V. Kunstförderverein
 James Sebastian: Zwischen Fülle und Leere. In: Sreeraj Gopinathan – SAMASYA – Irdisch und kosmisch zugleich, publisher: TARA art e.V. 
 Holger Christian Stockinger: Resensibilisierung – Im Universum der Sinne - zum ersten Teil des Projekts SAMASYA – Resensitization. In: Website Project SAMASYA
 Gregor Bendel: Von der Linie zum Licht. In: Sreeraj Gopinathan – Über dem Horizont: Lichtintegrierte Objekte, Bilder, Zeichnungen und Texte 1994–2002, publisher: TARA art e.V. art association, .
 Margit Hess: Suche nach dem Ungreifbaren. In: Sreeraj Gopinathan – Über dem Horizont: Lichtintegrierte Objekte, Bilder, Zeichnungen und Texte 1994–2002, publisher: TARA art e.V. art association, .
 Holger Christian Stockinger: Spurensuche nach den irdischen Wurzeln. In: Indisch Kulinarisch – Umweltshonend, klimafeundlich, vegan, Publication in internet, Part of the Project SAMASYA

References

External links 
Website Sreeraj Gopinathan
Literature by and about Sreeraj Gopinathan in the catalog of the German National Library
 Literature by and about Sreeraj Gopinathan in the catalog of the Bavarian State Library
 
Website Projekt OWIYAM
Website Projekt SAMASYA

German contemporary artists
Light artists
Indian installation artists
German performance artists
German male painters
21st-century German painters
21st-century German male artists
German male sculptors
21st-century German sculptors
21st-century Indian sculptors
Interdisciplinary artists
German conceptual artists
German installation artists
German environmentalists
1969 births
Living people
Indian performance artists
Indian contemporary artists